The Shire of Tambellup was a local government area in the Great Southern region of Western Australia, about  south of Katanning and about  south-southeast of the state capital, Perth.

The Tambellup Road District was gazetted on 13 October 1905. On 1 July 1961, it became a shire council following the enactment of the Local Government Act 1960, which reformed all remaining road districts into shires. On 1 July 2008, after 10 months of planning and preparation, it merged with the neighbouring Shire of Broomehill to form the Shire of Broomehill-Tambellup.

Wards
The shire was divided into 3 wards:

 Stirling Ward (3 councillors)
 Toolbrunup Ward (3 councillors)
 Warrenup Ward (3 councillors)

Towns and localities
 Tambellup
 Bobalong
 Borderdale
 Dartnall
 Lake Toolbrunup
 Moonies Hill
 Tunney
 Wansbrough

References

Tambellup
Great Southern (Western Australia)